Allen John Scott (born 1938) is a professor of geography and public policy at University of California, Los Angeles.

Biography 
Scott was born in Liverpool, England in 1938 and was raised in Carlisle. Scott graduated from St John's College, Oxford University, in 1961. He holds a Ph.D. degree from Northwestern University (1965). He has taught at the University of Pennsylvania, University College London, University of Toronto, University of Paris, University of Hong Kong, and from 1981 at the University of California, Los Angeles, where he was a distinguished professor with joint appointments in the Department of Public Policy and the Department of Geography. Scott became Professor Emeritus in 2013.

Awards and honors
 Professeur associé, elected by the French Comité Consultatif des Universités, 1974 - 1975.
 Croucher Fellow, University of Hong Kong, 1984
 Visiting Exchange Scholar under auspices of Committee on Scholarly Communication with the People's Republic of China, National Academy of Sciences, 1986
 Guggenheim Fellowship, 1986–87
 Awarded honors by the Association of American Geographers, 1987
 Elected fellow of the British Academy, 1999
 André Siegfried Chair, Institut d'Etudes Politiques, Paris, 1999
 Vautrin Lud Prize, 2003
 First Trust Bank Chair of Innovation, Queen's University, Belfast, 2004.
 Chaire d'Excellence Pierre de Fermat, University of Toulouse-Le Mirail, 2005
 Hallsworth Visiting Professorship, School of Environment and Development, University of Manchester, 2006
 Wibaut Chair, University of Amsterdam, 2006
 "On Hollywood: the Place, the Industry" awarded Meridian Book Prize, 2006
 Carol and Bruce Mallen Lifetime Achievement Award for Published Scholarly Contributions to Motion Picture Industry Studies, 2008
 Isaac Manasseh Meyer Fellowship, National University of Singapore, 2009
 Anders Retzius Gold Medal of the Swedish Society for Anthropology and Geography, awarded by King Carl XVI Gustaf of Sweden, 2009.
 Doctor Honoris Causa, Friedrich Schiller University of Jena, 2011
 Academic Icon, University of Malaya, Kuala Lumpur, Malaysia, 2012.
 Prix de l'Association des Economistes de Langues Néolatines, 2013.
 Elected to the Academia Europaea, 2013.
 Sir Peter Hall Prize, awarded by the Regional Studies Association, 2013.

References

External links

 Department of Geography at UCLA
 Department of Public Policy at UCLA
 2010LAB
 
 https://web.archive.org/web/20120425092737/http://www.jenatv.de/wissenschaft/Titel_vergeben:_Der_Brite_Allen_J_Scott_hat_die_Ehrendoktorwuerde_der_Uni_erhalten-5704.html

1938 births
Living people
American geographers
British geographers
Economic geographers
English emigrants to the United States
Fellows of the British Academy
Recipients of the Vautrin Lud International Geography Prize
Alumni of St John's College, Oxford
Northwestern University alumni
University of Pennsylvania faculty
Academic staff of the University of Paris
University of California, Los Angeles faculty
Urban geographers
Human geographers
British expatriate academics in the United States